The Sammarinese Democratic Socialist Party (PSDS) was a political party in San Marino.

History
The party began as a loose group of MPs in the Grand and General Council, and was part of the Popular Alliance alongside the Sammarinese Christian Democratic Party. It began to formally campaign under the PSDS name for the 1951 general elections, in which it won three seats. It was reduced to two seats in the 1955 elections, and ceased to exist in 1957 when it merged with a group of six MPs who had left the Sammarinese Socialist Party to form the Sammarinese Independent Democratic Socialist Party.

References

Defunct political parties in San Marino
Political parties disestablished in 1957
1957 disestablishments in San Marino
Socialist parties in Europe
Socialism in San Marino